Kiwyu Waqanan (Jaqaru kiwyu a kind of partridges, Quechua waqay crying, to cry, -na a suffix, "where the partridge cries", Hispanicized spelling Quiviohuaganan) is a mountain in the northern part of the Paryaqaqa mountain range in the Andes of Peru which reaches an altitude of approximately . It is located in the Junín Region, Yauli Province, in the districts of Huay-Huay and Yauli. Kiwyu Waqanan lies northeast of Chumpi.

References

Mountains of Peru
Mountains of Junín Region